Margit Frenk Freund (in full, Margarita Ana María Frenk y Freund), sometimes known by her married name, Margit Frenk Alatorre (b. Hamburg, 21 August 1925) is a German-Mexican philologist, folklorist and translator. She has been an Academic Numerary of the Mexican Language Academy since 1993. She is also a Doctor Honoris Causa at the National Autonomous University of Mexico (UNAM).

Biography
Frenk's Jewish parents moved the family from Germany to Mexico in 1930 as Nazis gained power. Her mother was Mariana Frenk-Westheima writer of Spanish-Mexican prose, hispanist, lecturer of literature, museum expert and a Mexican translator. Her father was  Ernst Frenk, a physician. After he died Frenk's mother remarried, to another German Jewish refugee, Paul Westheim.

In 1946, she spent some time at Bryn Mawr College on a scholarship, studying English Literature and Spanish Theater of the 16th Century. This was followed by a few years at Berkeley, where she taught Spanish, learned Italian and studied Spanish Literature.

After obtaining her MA, she returned home to study at the College of Mexico, where she was a professor and researcher from 1950 to 1980, except for a brief stay in Paris to attend classes by Marcel Bataillon.  She was a collaborator on the Nueva Revista de Filología Hispánica (NRFH), which was managed by Raimundo Lida and, later, by Antonio Alatorre, whom she married. Beginning in 1958, she was the coordinator for a group of researchers who, between 1975 and 1985, produced the five volume Mexican Folk Songbook.

She has been a professor at UNAM since 1966 where, in 2000, she founded the Revista de Literaturas Populares, which she still edits, and She is a member of the scientific committee on the Spanish academic journal Paremia. From 1986-1996, she was coordinator of the Center for Literary Studies at the Institute for Philological Research at UNAM, where she founded the magazine Literatura Mexicana. She is also an honorary President of the International Association of Hispanistas.

In 2000, she won the Mexican National Prize for Arts and Sciences (Language and Literature). In 2006, she won the Alfonso Reyes International Prize and, in 2009, the 23rd Menéndez Pelayo International Prize.

In 2013, Frenk sued the executrix of Charlotte Weidler's estate,  Yris Rabenou Solomon, in New York County Supreme Court for paintings that had belonged to her stepfather, Paul Westheim.  The paintings included a Paul Klee watercolor and Max Pechstein’s “Portrait of Paul Westheim.  Westheim had confided the paintings to Weidler when he fled Nazi Germany, and when he wanted to recover them, Weidler had claimed, falsely, that they had been destroyed in the war. "Much of the case hinged on a 1973 release through which Frenk’s mother, Marianna, relinquished claims to all the artworks in Westheim’s collection. Margit claimed that the release was fraudulently induced because Weidler had kept secret the whereabouts of Westheim’s holdings." The case was dismissed in 2019.

Selected works
 Lírica Hispánica de Tipo Popular: Edad Media y Renacimiento, Universidad Nacional Autónoma de México (1966)
 Estudios Sobre Lírica Antigua. Castalia (1978) 
 Entre Folklore y Literatura, El Colegio de México (1984) 
 Cancionero de Romances Viejos, Universidad Nacional Autónoma de México (1984) 
 Charla de Pájaros o Las Aves en la Poesía Folklórica Mexicana, UNAM (1994) 
 Lírica Española de Tipo Popular, Cátedra (2001) 
 Poesía Popular Hispánica : 44 estudios, Fondo de Cultural Económico (2006) 
 Estudios de Lingüística, El Colegio de México (2007) .

References

External links
 Dialnet: Complete list of works by Frenk

German emigrants to Mexico
Academic staff of the National Autonomous University of Mexico
Mexican editors
Mexican women editors
Members of the Mexican Academy of Language
Jewish emigrants from Nazi Germany
University of California, Berkeley alumni
1925 births
Living people
Bryn Mawr College alumni
Mexican expatriates in the United States